Otto A. Vogel was a member of the Wisconsin State Assembly.

Biography
Vogel was born on October 10, 1886, in Newton, Manitowoc County, Wisconsin. He died on September 19, 1951, and is buried in Manitowoc, Wisconsin.

Career
Vogel was a member of the Assembly three times. First, from 1935 to 1936, second, from 1939 to 1940 and third, from 1943 to 1948. Additionally, he was a justice of the peace from 1912 to 1918 and a Manitowoc alderman from 1918 to 1930 and again from 1932 to 1934. He was a member of the Wisconsin Progressive Party.

References

External links

1886 births
1951 deaths
American justices of the peace
Wisconsin city council members
Members of the Wisconsin State Assembly
People from Newton, Manitowoc County, Wisconsin
Wisconsin Progressives (1924)
20th-century American politicians
20th-century American judges